William Eugene Higby was the 29th Lieutenant Governor of Colorado, serving from 1943 to 1947 under John Charles Vivian.

External links

Lieutenant Governors of Colorado